John David Stamps (2 December 1918 – 19 November 1991) was an English footballer who scored two goals in the 1946 FA Cup Final for Derby County in a 4–1 win against Charlton Athletic. This is Derby's only FA Cup triumph. Stamps came close to scoring in regular time but the ball burst as he shot, making it easier to save. Stamps was famous for his powerful shot and is a cult figure in Derby County history, with the club's annual Player of the Year award being named after him.

In 1942–43, Stamps made 14 guest appearances for Southampton, scoring 11 goals.

He played for Burton Albion in the 1954–1955 season, signed by manager Reg Weston. He had scored 12 goals (including 2 penalties) in the Birmingham League and 6 goals in cup ties before the boxing day match against Gresley Rovers.

He died in November 1991, shortly before his 73rd birthday. Although blind for the final 20 years of his life, he continued to attend Derby County games.

There was a pub in Derby city centre named after him, opened in 1998, but in the early 2000s it was changed to a Walkabout bar.

References

External links
 1946 FA Cup Final Report from the Derby Evening Telegraph

1918 births
1991 deaths
Footballers from Rotherham
English footballers
Mansfield Town F.C. players
New Brighton A.F.C. players
Derby County F.C. players
Shrewsbury Town F.C. players
Burton Albion F.C. players
Southampton F.C. wartime guest players
English Football League players
Association football forwards
FA Cup Final players